State House or statehouse may refer to:

Buildings 
State House, Barbados, the official residence of the President of Barbados
State House, Bermuda, the original parliament building
State House (Kenya), the official residence of the President of Kenya
State House (Mauritius), the official residence of the President of the Republic of Mauritius
State House (Pennsylvania), the official residence of the Lieutenant Governor of Pennsylvania
State House (Seychelles), the official residence of the President of the Seychelles
State House (Sierra Leone), the official residence of the President of the Sierra Leone
State House (Tanzania), the official residence of the President of Tanzania
State House (Uganda), the official residence of the President of Uganda
State House (Zimbabwe), the official residence of the President of Zimbabwe in Harare
State House (Bulawayo), the official residence of the President of Zimbabwe in Bulawayo
State House of Namibia, the official residence of the President of Namibia
Aso Villa or State House, the official residence of the President of Nigeria
Government House, Dominica or The State House, the official residence of the President of Dominica

United States 
Capitol building of a U.S. state; see List of state capitols in the United States
Metonym for Governor (United States), chief executive officer of a state or territory
Lower house of a state legislature (House of Representatives or House of Delegates); see List of U.S. state legislatures
Metonym for the State legislature (United States), the legislative body of a state

Other uses 
State House (train), an American passenger train
State housing, the government-owned public housing system in New Zealand

See also
 
 
 Official residence,  residence at which a nation's leader or other senior figure officially resides